ASKA, is an American heavy metal band formed in 1990 in Dallas–Fort Worth, Texas.  The 1990 iteration of the band included Darren Knapp, Damon Call, George Call, and Lamberto Alvarez. In 1992, ASKA began touring for the United States Department of Defense until 2000.

ASKA has played at American metal rock festivals such as Rocklahoma, as well as overseas festivals such as Germany's 12th annual Keep It True festival. As of 2011, the band has toured 37 countries.

ASKA has released six studio albums.

Discography
Aska (1991)
Immortal (1994)
Nine Tongues (1997)
Avenger (2000)
Absolute Power (2007)
Fire Eater (2013)

Line-up

Current members

George Call – vocals and guitar
Keith Knight – bass and vocals
Danny White – drums
Bryant Contreras - guitar

Former members
Darren Knapp
Damon Call
Jason Sweatt
Daryl Norton
Chris Menta

External links

ASKA at Encyclopaedia Metallum

References 

Heavy metal musical groups from Texas
Musical groups established in 1990